Chimarra adella is a species of fingernet caddisfly in the family Philopotamidae. It is found in North America, typically in the United States.

References 

Trichoptera
Insects described in 1952